Young Earth creationism (YEC) is a form of creationism which holds as a central tenet that the Earth and its lifeforms were created by supernatural acts of the Abrahamic God between approximately 6,000 and 10,000 years ago. In its most widespread version, YEC is based on the religious belief in the inerrancy of certain literal interpretations of the Book of Genesis. Its primary adherents are Christians and Jews who believe that God created the Earth in six literal days. This is in contrast with old Earth creationism (OEC), which holds literal interpretations of Genesis that are compatible with the scientifically determined ages of the Earth and universe. It is also in contrast to theistic evolution, which posits that the scientific principles of evolution, the Big Bang, abiogenesis, solar nebular theory, age of the universe, and age of Earth are compatible with a metaphorical interpretation of Genesis.

Since the mid-20th century, Young Earth creationists—starting with Henry Morris (1918–2006)—have developed and promoted a pseudoscientific explanation called creation science as a basis for a religious belief in a supernatural, geologically recent creation, in response to the scientific acceptance of Charles Darwin's Theory of Evolution, which was developed over the previous century. Contemporary YEC movements arose in protest to the scientific consensus, established by numerous scientific disciplines, which demonstrates that the age of the universe is around 13.8 billion years, the formation of the Earth and Solar System happened around 4.6 billion years ago, and the origin of life occurred roughly 4 billion years ago.

A 2017 Gallup creationism survey found that 38 percent of adults in the United States held the view that "God created humans in their present form at one time within the last 10,000 years" when asked for their views on the origin and development of human beings, which Gallup noted was the lowest level in 35 years. It was suggested that the level of support could be lower when poll results are adjusted after comparison with other polls with questions that more specifically account for uncertainty and ambivalence. Gallup found that, when asking a similar question in 2019, 40 percent of US adults held the view that "God created human beings pretty much in their present form at one time within the last 10,000 years or so".

Among the biggest YEC organizations are Answers in Genesis, Institute for Creation Research, and Creation Ministries International.

Background and history

Biblical dates for creation

Young Earth creationists have claimed that their view has its earliest roots in ancient Judaism, citing, for example, the commentary on Genesis by Ibn Ezra (c. 1089–1164). That said, Shai Cherry of Vanderbilt University notes that modern Jewish theologians have generally rejected such literal interpretations of the written text, and that even Jewish commentators who oppose some aspects of science generally accept scientific evidence that the Earth is much older. Some controversy has arisen among Ultra-Orthodox Jews, some of whom accept the age and some of whom reject it. Several early Jewish scholars, including Philo, followed an allegorical interpretation of Genesis.

The most accepted and popular date of creation among Young Earth creationists is 4004 BC because this specific date appears in the Ussher chronology. This chronology was included in many Bibles from 1701 onwards, including the authorized King James Version . The youngest ever recorded date of creation within the historic Jewish or Christian traditions is 3616 BC, by Yom-Tov Lipmann-Muhlhausen, while the oldest proposed date was 6984 BC by Alfonso X of Castile. However, some contemporary or more recent proponents of Young Earth creationism have proposed dates that are several thousands of years earlier by theorizing significant gaps in the genealogies in chapters 5 and 11 of the Book of Genesis. Harold Camping, for example, dated the creation to 11,013 BC, while Christian Charles Josias Bunsen in the 19th century dated the creation to 20,000 BC.

The Protestant reformation hermeneutic inclined some of the Reformers, including John Calvin and Martin Luther, and later Protestants toward a literal reading of the Bible as translated. This means they believed that the "days" referred to in Genesis correspond to ordinary days, in contrast to reading the "days" as standing in for a longer period of time.

Famous poets and playwrights of the Early Modern Period (1500–1800) referenced an Earth that was thousands of years old. For example William Shakespeare:

Scientific Revolution and the old Earth
Beginning in the 18th century, support for a young Earth declined among scientists and philosophers as new knowledge including discoveries of the Scientific Revolution and philosophies of the Age of Enlightenment.  In particular, discoveries in geology required an Earth that was much older than thousands of years, and proposals such as Abraham Gottlob Werner's Neptunism attempted to incorporate what was understood from geological investigations into a coherent description of the Earth's natural history. James Hutton, now regarded as the father of modern geology, went further and opened up the concept of deep time for scientific inquiry. Rather than assuming that the Earth was deteriorating from a primal state, he maintained that the Earth was infinitely old. Hutton stated that:

Hutton's main line of argument was that the tremendous displacements and changes he was seeing did not happen in a short period of time by means of catastrophe, but that the incremental processes of uplift and erosion happening on the Earth in the present day had caused them. As these processes were very gradual, the Earth needed to be ancient, in order to allow time for the changes to occur. While his ideas of Plutonism were hotly contested, scientific inquiries on competing ideas of catastrophism pushed back the age of the Earth into the millions of years – still much younger than commonly accepted by modern scientists, but much older than the young Earth of less than 20,000 years in which Biblical literalists believed.

Hutton's ideas, called uniformitarianism or gradualism, were popularized by Sir Charles Lyell in the early 19th century. The energetic advocacy and rhetoric of Lyell led to the public and scientific communities largely accepting an ancient Earth. By this time, the Reverends William Buckland, Adam Sedgwick and other early geologists had abandoned their earlier ideas of catastrophism related to a biblical flood and confined their explanations to local floods. By the 1830s, the scientific consensus had abandoned a young Earth as a serious hypothesis.

John H. Mears was one of several scholars proposing Biblical interpretations ranging from a series of long or indefinite periods interspersed with moments of creation to a day-age theory of indefinite 'days'. He subscribed to the latter theory (indefinite days) and found support from the side of Yale professor James Dwight Dana, one of the fathers of mineralogy, who wrote a paper consisting of four articles named 'Science and the Bible' on the topic. As many biblical scholars reinterpreted Genesis 1 in the light of Lyell's geological results with the support of a number of renowned (Christian) scientific scholars, Developmentalism, a form of theistic evolution based on Darwin's Natural selection, grew in acceptance.

This 19th century trend was contested. The scriptural geologists and later the founders of the Victoria Institute opposed the decline of support for a biblically literal young Earth.

Christian fundamentalism and belief in a young Earth
The rise of fundamentalist Christianity early in the 20th century brought rejection of evolution. Its leaders explained an ancient Earth through belief in the gap or in the day-age interpretation of Genesis. In 1923, George McCready Price, a Seventh-day Adventist, wrote The New Geology, a book partly inspired by the book Patriarchs and Prophets in which Seventh-day Adventist prophet Ellen G. White described the impact of the Great Flood on the shape of the Earth. Although not an accredited geologist, Price's writings, which were based on reading geological texts and documents rather than field or laboratory work, provide an explicitly fundamentalist perspective on geology. The book attracted a small following, with its advocates almost all being Lutheran pastors and Seventh-day Adventists in North America. Price became popular with fundamentalists for his opposition to evolution, though they continued to believe in an ancient Earth.

In the 1950s, Price's work came under severe criticism, particularly by Bernard Ramm in his book The Christian View of Science and Scripture. Together with J. Laurence Kulp, a geologist and in fellowship with the Plymouth Brethren, and other scientists, Ramm influenced Christian organizations such as the American Scientific Affiliation (ASA) in not supporting flood geology.

Price's work was subsequently adapted and updated by Henry M. Morris and John C. Whitcomb Jr. in their book The Genesis Flood in 1961. Morris and Whitcomb argued that the Earth was geologically recent and that the Great Flood had laid down most of the geological strata in the space of a single year, reviving pre-uniformitarian arguments. Given this history, they argued, "the last refuge of the case for evolution immediately vanishes away, and the record of the rocks becomes a tremendous witness... to the holiness and justice and power of the living God of Creation!"

This became the foundation of a new generation of Young Earth creationist believers, who organized themselves around Morris' Institute for Creation Research. Sister organizations such as the Creation Research Society have sought to re-interpret geological formations within a Young Earth creationist viewpoint. Langdon Gilkey writes:

Impact
A 2006 joint statement of InterAcademy Panel on International Issues (IAP) by 68 national and international science academies enumerated the scientific facts that Young Earth creationism contradicts, in particular that the universe, the Earth, and life are billions of years old, that each has undergone continual change over those billions of years, and that life on Earth has evolved from a common primordial origin into the diverse forms observed in the fossil record and present today. Evolutionary theory remains the only explanation that fully accounts for all the observations, measurements, data, and evidence discovered in the fields of biology, ecology, anatomy, physiology, zoology, paleontology, molecular biology, genetics, anthropology, and others.

As such, Young Earth creationism is dismissed by the academic and the scientific communities. One 1987 estimate found that "700 scientists ... (out of a total of 480,000 U.S. earth and life scientists) ... give credence to creation-science". An expert in the evolution-creationism controversy, professor and author Brian Alters, states that "99.9% of scientists accept evolution". A 1991 Gallup poll found that about 5 per cent of American scientists (including those with training outside biology) identified themselves as creationists. For their part, Young Earth creationists say that the lack of support for their beliefs by the scientific community is due to discrimination and censorship by professional science journals and professional science organizations. This viewpoint was explicitly rejected in the rulings from the 1981 United States District Court case McLean v. Arkansas Board of Education as no witness was able to produce any articles that had been refused publication and the judge could not conceive how "a loose knit group of independent thinkers in all the varied fields of science could, or would, so effectively censor new scientific thought". A 1985 study also found that only 18 out of 135,000 submissions to scientific journals advocated creationism.

Morris' ideas had a considerable impact on creationism and fundamentalist Christianity. Armed with the backing of conservative organizations and individuals, his brand of "creation science" was widely promoted throughout the United States and overseas, with his books being translated into at least ten different languages. The inauguration of so-called "Young Earth creationism" as a religious position has, on occasion, impacted science education in the United States, where periodic controversies have raged over the appropriateness of teaching YEC doctrine and creation science in public schools (see Teach the Controversy) alongside or in replacement of the theory of evolution. Young Earth creationism has not had as large an impact in the less literalist circles of Christianity. Some churches, such as the Roman Catholic Church and the Eastern Orthodox churches, accede to the possibility of theistic evolution; though individual church members support Young Earth creationism and do so without those churches' explicit condemnation.

Adherence to Young Earth creationism and rejection of evolution is higher in the U.S. than in most of the rest of the Western world. A 2012 Gallup survey reported that 46 per cent of Americans believed in the creationist view that God created humans in their present form at one time within the last 10,000 years, a statistic which has remained essentially the same since 1982; for those with a postgraduate education, only 25 per cent believed in the creationist viewpoint. About one third of Americans believed that humans evolved with God's guidance and 15 per cent said humans evolved, but that God had no part in the process.  A 2009 poll by Harris Interactive found that 39 per cent of Americans agreed with the statement that "God created the universe, the earth, the sun, moon, stars, plants, animals, and the first two people within the past 10,000 years", yet only 18 per cent of the Americans polled agreed with the statement "The earth is less than 10,000 years old".  A 2017 Gallup creationism survey found that 38 per cent of adults in the United States inclined to the view that "God created humans in their present form at one time within the last 10,000 years" when asked for their views on the origin and development of human beings, which Gallup noted was the lowest level in 35 years.

Reasons for the higher rejection of evolution in the U.S. include the abundance of fundamentalist Christians compared to Europe. A 2011 Gallup survey reported that 30 per cent of Americans said the Bible is the actual word of God and should be interpreted literally, a statistic which had fallen slightly from the late 1970s. Some 54 per cent of those who attended church weekly and 46 per cent of those with a high school education or less took the Bible literally.

Characteristics and beliefs
The common belief of Young Earth creationists is that the Earth and life were created in six 24-hour periods, 6,000–10,000 years ago. However, there are different approaches to how this is possible given the geological evidence for much longer timescales. The Science Education Resource Center at Carleton College has identified two major types of YEC belief systems:

Believers in flood geology attach great importance to the biblical story of Noah's Flood in explaining the fossil record and geological strata. Major American YEC organizations such as the Institute for Creation Research and Answers in Genesis support this approach with detailed argumentation and references to scientific evidence, though often framed with pseudoscientific misconceptions.
A less-visible form of YEC not seen as often on the internet is one which claims that there has been essentially no development of the Universe, Earth, or life whatsoever since creation—that creation has been in a steady state since the beginning without major changes. According to Ronald Numbers, this belief, which does not necessarily try to explain scientific evidence through appeal to a global flood, has not been promoted as much as the former example given. Such YECs believe that fossils are not real and that major extinctions never occurred, so dinosaurs, trilobites, and other examples of extinct organisms found in the fossil record would have to either be hoaxes or simply secular lies, promoted perhaps by the devil.

View of the Bible

Young Earth creationists regard the Bible as a historically accurate, factually inerrant record of natural history. As Henry Morris, a leading Young Earth creationist, explained it, "Christians who flirt with less-than-literal readings of biblical texts are also flirting with theological disaster." According to Morris, Christians must "either ... believe God's Word all the way, or not at all." Young Earth creationists consider the account of creation given in Genesis to be a factual record of the origin of the Earth and life, and that Bible-believing Christians must therefore regard Genesis 1–11 as historically accurate.

Interpretations of Genesis

Young Earth creationists interpret the text of Genesis as strictly literal. Young Earth creationists reject allegorical readings of Genesis and further argue that if there was not a literal Fall of Man, Noah's Ark, or Tower of Babel this would undermine core Christian doctrines like the birth and resurrection of Jesus Christ.

The genealogies of Genesis record the line of descent from Adam through Noah to Abraham. Young Earth creationists interpret these genealogies literally, including the old ages of the men. For example, Methuselah lived 969 years according to the genealogy. Differences of opinion exist regarding whether the genealogies should be taken as complete or abbreviated, hence the 6,000 to 10,000 year range usually quoted for the Earth's age. In contrast, Old Earth Creationists tend to interpret the genealogies as incomplete, and usually interpret the days of Genesis 1 figuratively as long periods of time.

Young Earth creationists believe that the flood described in Genesis 6–9 did occur, was global in extent, and submerged all dry land on Earth. Some Young Earth creationists go further and advocate a kind of flood geology which relies on the appropriation of late eighteenth and early nineteenth century arguments in favor of catastrophism made by such scientists as Georges Cuvier and Richard Kirwan. This approach which was replaced by the mid-nineteenth century almost entirely by uniformitarianism was adopted most famously by George McCready Price and this legacy is reflected in the most prominent YEC organizations today. YEC ideas to accommodate the massive amount of water necessary for a flood that was global in scale included inventing such constructs as an orbiting vapor canopy which would have collapsed and generated the necessary extreme rainfall or a rapid movement of tectonic plates causing underground aquifers or tsunamis from underwater volcanic steam to inundate the planet.

Age of the Earth

The Young Earth creationist belief that the age of the Earth is 6,000 to 10,000 years old conflicts with the age of 4.54 billion years measured using independently cross-validated geochronological methods including radiometric dating. Creationists dispute these and all other methods which demonstrate the timescale of geologic history in spite of the lack of scientific evidence that there are any inconsistencies or errors in the measurement of the Earth's age.

Between 1997 and 2005, a team of scientists at the Institute for Creation Research conducted an eight-year research project entitled RATE (Radioisotopes and the Age of The Earth) to assess the validity and accuracy of radiometric dating techniques. While they concluded that there was overwhelming evidence for over 500 million years' worth of radioactive decay, they claimed to have found other scientific evidence to prove a young Earth. They therefore proposed that nuclear decay rates were accelerated by a factor of one billion during the Creation week and at the time of the Flood. However, when subjected to independent scrutiny by non-affiliated experts, their analyses were shown to be flawed.

Human history

Young Earth creationists reject almost all of the results of physical anthropology and human evolution and instead insist that Adam and Eve were the universal ancestors of every human to have ever lived. Noah's flood as reported in the book of Genesis is said to have killed all humans on Earth with the exception of Noah and his sons and their wives, so Young Earth creationists also argue that all humans alive today are descended from this single family.

The literal belief that the world's linguistic variety originated with the tower of Babel is pseudoscientific, sometimes called pseudolinguistics, and it is contrary to what is known about the origin and history of languages.

Flood geology, the fossil record, and dinosaurs

Young Earth creationists reject the geologic evidence that the stratigraphic sequence of fossils proves the Earth is billions of years old. In his Illogical Geology, expanded in 1913 as The Fundamentals of Geology, George McCready Price argued that the occasionally out-of-order sequence of fossils that are shown to be due to thrust faults made it impossible to prove any one fossil was older than any other. His "law" that fossils could be found in any order implied that strata could not be dated sequentially. He instead proposed that essentially all fossils were buried during the flood and thus inaugurated flood geology. In numerous books and articles he promoted this concept, focusing his attack on the sequence of the geologic time scale as "the devil's counterfeit of the six days of Creation as recorded in the first chapter of Genesis." Today, many Young Earth creationists still contend that the fossil record can be explained by the global flood.

In The Genesis Flood (1961) Henry M. Morris reiterated Price's arguments, and wrote that because there had been no death before the Fall of Man, he felt "compelled to date all the rock strata which contain fossils of once-living creatures as subsequent to Adam's fall", attributing most to the flood. He added that humans and dinosaurs had lived together, quoting Clifford L. Burdick for the report that dinosaur tracks had supposedly been found overlapping a human track in the Paluxy River bed Glen Rose Formation. He was subsequently advised that he might have been misled, and Burdick wrote to Morris in September 1962 that "you kind of stuck your neck out in publishing those Glen Rose tracks." In the third printing of the book this section was removed.

Following in this vein, many Young Earth creationists, especially those associated with the more visible organizations, do not deny the existence of dinosaurs and other extinct animals present in the fossil record. Usually, they claim that the fossils represent the remains of animals that perished in the flood. A number of creationist organizations further propose that Noah took the dinosaurs with him in the ark, and that they only began to disappear as a result of a different post-flood environment. The Creation Museum in Kentucky portrays humans and dinosaurs coexisting before the Flood while the California roadside attraction Cabazon Dinosaurs describes dinosaurs as being created the same day as Adam and Eve. The Creation Evidence Museum in Glen Rose, Texas, has a "hyperbaric biosphere" intended to reproduce the atmospheric conditions before the Flood which could grow dinosaurs. The proprietor Carl Baugh says that these conditions made creatures grow larger and live longer, so that humans of that time were giants.

As the term "dinosaur" was coined by Richard Owen in 1842, the Bible does not use the word "dinosaur". Some creationist organizations propose that the Hebrew word  (תנין), mentioned nearly thirty times in the Old Testament, should be considered a synonym. In English translations,  has been translated as "sea monster" or "serpent", but most often it is translated as "dragon". Additionally, in the Book of Job, a "behemoth" is described as a creature that "moves his tail like a cedar"; the behemoth is described as ranking "first among the works of God" and as impossible to capture (vs. 24). Biblical scholars have alternatively identified the behemoth as either an elephant, a hippopotamus, or a bull, but some creationists have identified the behemoth with sauropod dinosaurs, often specifically the Brachiosaurus according to their interpretation of the verse "He is the chief of the ways of God" implying that the behemoth is the largest animal God created. The leviathan is another creature referred to in the Bible's Old Testament that some creationists argue is actually a dinosaur. Alternatively, more mainstream scholars have identified the Leviathan with the Nile crocodile or, because Ugarit texts describe it as having seven heads, a purely mythical beast similar to the Lernaean Hydra.

A subset of adherents of the pseudoscience of cryptozoology promote Young Earth creationism, particularly in the context of so-called "living dinosaurs". Science writer Sharon A. Hill observes that the Young Earth creationist segment of cryptozoology is "well-funded and able to conduct expeditions with a goal of finding a living dinosaur that they think would invalidate evolution." Anthropologist Jeb J. Card says that "Creationists have embraced cryptozoology and some cryptozoological expeditions are funded by and conducted by creationists hoping to disprove evolution." Young Earth creationists occasionally claim that dinosaurs survived in Australia, and that Aboriginal legends of reptilian monsters are evidence of this, referring to what is known as Megalania (Varanus priscus). However, Megalania was a gigantic monitor lizard, and not a dinosaur, as its discoverer, Richard Owen, realized that the skeletal remains were that of a lizard, and not an archosaur. Some creationists believe that Mokele-mbembe, a cryptid said to dwell deep in the Congo rainforest, may be a living sauropod, though the scientific consensus is that this is extremely unlikely.

In a 2019 issue of Skeptical Inquirer science author Philip J. Senter details many 16th and 17th century hoaxes who constructed composite dragons which Senter calls the "Piltdown Men of Creationism" stating that many Young Earth creationists believe these hoaxes even though "the fakes don't even resemble the very animals the creationist authors claim they are". Other more recent hoaxes such as the Cardiff Giant, the Silverbell artifacts, the Burdick tracks and the Acámbaro figures are still being cited as proof of a young earth even though some of the hoaxers confessed. Young Earth creationists according to Senter are quick to point out the embarrassing forgeries that some scientists believed for years such as the Piltdown Man. Senter continues "But it is also somewhat hypocritical, for the YEC literature is replete with cases in which its own authors have fallen for taxidermic 'dragon' hoaxes".

Attitude towards science

Young Earth creationism is most famous for an opposition to the theory of evolution, but believers also are on record opposing many measurements, facts, and principles in the fields of physics and chemistry, dating methods including radiometric dating, geology, astronomy, cosmology, and paleontology. Young Earth creationists do not accept any explanation for natural phenomena which deviates from the veracity of a plain reading of the Bible, whether it be the origins of biological diversity, the origins of life, the geological, atmospheric, and oceanic history of Earth, the origins of the Solar System and Earth, formation of the earliest chemical elements or the origins of the universe itself. This has led some Young Earth creationists to criticize other creationist proposals such as intelligent design, for not taking a strong stand on the age of the Earth, special creation, or even the identity of the designer.

Young Earth creationists disagree with the methodological naturalism that is part of the scientific method. Instead, they assert the actions of God as described in the Bible occurred as written and therefore only scientific evidence that points to the Bible being correct can be accepted. See Creation–evolution controversy for a more complete discussion.

Compared to other forms of creationism

As a position that developed out of the explicitly anti-intellectual side of the Fundamentalist–Modernist Controversy in the early parts of the twentieth century, there is no single unified nor consistent consensus on how creationism as a belief system ought to reconcile its adherents' acceptance of biblical inerrancy with empirical facts of the Universe. Although Young Earth creationism is one of the most stridently literalist positions taken among professed creationists, there are also examples of biblical literalist adherents to both geocentrism and a flat Earth. Conflicts between different kinds of creationists are rather common, but three in particular are of particular relevance to YEC: Old Earth Creationism, Gap creationism, and the Omphalos hypothesis.

Old Earth creationism

Young Earth creationists reject old Earth creationism and day-age creationism on textual and theological grounds. In addition, they claim that the scientific data in geology and astronomy point to a young Earth, against the consensus of the general scientific community.

Young Earth creationists generally hold that, when Genesis describes the creation of the Earth occurring over a period of days, this indicates normal-length 24-hour days, and cannot reasonably be interpreted otherwise. They agree that the Hebrew word for "day" (yôm) can refer to either a 24-hour day or a long or unspecified time; but argue that, whenever the latter interpretation is used, it includes a preposition defining the long or unspecified period. In the specific context of Genesis 1, since the days are both numbered and are referred to as "evening and morning", this can mean only normal-length days. Further, they argue that the 24-hour day is the only interpretation that makes sense of the Sabbath command in Exodus 20:8–11. YECs argue that it is a glaring exegetical fallacy to take a meaning from one context (yom referring to a long period of time in Genesis 1) and apply it to a completely different one (yom referring to normal-length days in Exodus 20).

Hebrew scholars reject the rule that yôm with a number or an "evening and morning" construct can only refer to 24-hour days. Hugh Ross has pointed out that the earliest reference to this rule dates back to Young Earth creationist literature in the 1970s and that no reference to it exists independent of the young Earth movement.

Gap creationism

The "gap theory" acknowledges a vast age for the universe, including the Earth and solar system, while asserting that life was created recently in six 24-hour days by divine fiat. Genesis 1 is thus interpreted literally, with an indefinite "gap" of time inserted between the first two verses. (Some gap theorists insert a "primordial creation" and Lucifer's rebellion into the gap.) Young Earth creationist organizations argue that the gap theory is unscriptural, unscientific, and not necessary, in its various forms.

Omphalos hypothesis

Many Young Earth creationists distinguish their own hypotheses from the "Omphalos hypothesis", today more commonly referred to as the apparent age concept, put forth by the naturalist and science writer Philip Henry Gosse. Omphalos was an unsuccessful mid-19th century attempt to reconcile creationism with geology. Gosse proposed that just as Adam had a navel (omphalos is Greek for navel), evidence of a gestation he never experienced, so also the Earth was created ex nihilo complete with evidence of a prehistoric past that never actually occurred. The Omphalos hypothesis allows for a young Earth without giving rise to any predictions that would contradict scientific findings of an old Earth. Although both logically unassailable and consistent with a literal reading of scripture, Omphalos was rejected at the time by scientists on the grounds that it was completely unfalsifiable and by theologians because it implied to them a deceitful God, which they found theologically unacceptable.

Today, in contrast to Gosse, Young Earth creationists posit that not only is the Earth young but that the scientific data supports that view. However, the apparent age concept is still used in Young Earth creationist literature. There are examples of Young Earth creationists arguing that Adam did not have a navel.

Criticism
Young Earth creationists adhere strongly to a concept of biblical inerrancy, and regard the Bible as divinely inspired and "infallible and completely authoritative on all matters with which they deal, free from error of any sort, scientific and historical as well as moral and theological". Young Earth creationists also suggest that supporters of modern scientific understanding with which they disagree are primarily motivated by atheism. Critics reject this claim by pointing out that many supporters of evolutionary theory are religious believers, and that major religious groups, such as the Roman Catholic Church, the Eastern Orthodox Church, the Anglican Communion and mainline Protestant churches, believe that concepts such as physical cosmology, chemical origins of life, biological evolution, and geological fossil records do not imply a rejection of the scriptures. Critics also point out that workers in fields related to biology, chemistry, physics, or geosciences are not required to sign statements of belief in contemporary science comparable to the biblical inerrancy pledges required by creationist organizations, contrary to the creationist claim that scientists operate on an a priori disbelief in biblical principles.

Creationists also discount certain modern Christian theological positions, like those of French Jesuit priest, geologist and paleontologist Pierre Teilhard de Chardin, who saw that his work with evolutionary sciences actually confirmed and inspired his faith in the cosmic Christ; or those of Thomas Berry, a cultural historian and ecotheologian, that the cosmological 13-billion-year "Universe Story" provides all faiths and all traditions with a single account by which the divine has made its presence in the world.

Proponents of Young Earth creationism are regularly accused of quote mining, the practice of isolating passages from academic texts that appear to support their claims, while deliberately excluding context and conclusions to the contrary. For example, scientists acknowledge that there are indeed a number of mysteries about the Universe left to be solved, and scientists actively working in the fields who identify inconsistencies or problems with extant models, when pressed, explicitly reject creationist interpretations. Theologians and philosophers have also criticized this "God of the gaps" viewpoint.

In defending against Young Earth creationist attacks on "evolutionism" and "Darwinism", scientists and skeptics have offered rejoinders that every challenge made by proponents of YEC is either made in an unscientific fashion, or is readily explainable by science.

Theological considerations

Few modern theologians take the Genesis account of creation literally. Even many Christian evangelicals who reject the notion of purely naturalistic Darwinian evolution often treat the story as a nonliteral saga, as poetry, or as liturgical literature.

Genesis contains two accounts of the Creation: in chapter 1 man was created after the animals, while in chapter 2 man was created before the animals. Proponents of the Documentary hypothesis suggest that Genesis 1 was a litany from the Priestly source (possibly from an early Jewish liturgy), while Genesis 2 was assembled from older Jahwist material, holding that, for both stories to be a single account, Adam would have named all the animals, and God would have created Eve from his rib as a suitable mate, all within a single 24 hour period. Creationists responding to this point attribute the view to misunderstanding having arisen from poor translation of the tenses in Genesis 2 in contemporary translations of the Bible (e.g. compare "planted" and "had planted" in the King James Version and New International Version).

Some Christians assert that the Bible is free from error only in religious and moral matters, and that, where scientific or historic questions are concerned, the Bible should not be read literally. This position is held by a number of major denominations. For instance, in a publication entitled The Gift of Scripture, the Roman Catholic Church in England and Wales comments that, "We should not expect to find in Scripture full scientific accuracy or complete historical precision". The Bible is held to be true in passages relating to human salvation, but, "We should not expect total accuracy from the Bible in other, secular matters". While the Catholic Church teaches that the Bible's message is without error, it does not consider it always to be literal. By contrast, Young Earth creationists contend that moral and spiritual matters in the Bible are intimately connected with its historical accuracy; in their view, the Bible stands or falls as a single indivisible block of knowledge.

Christian and Jewish theology actually has a long story of not interpreting the Genesis creation narrative literally: already in the 2nd century CE, Christian theologian and apologist Origen wrote that it was inconceivable to consider Genesis literal history, while Augustine of Hippo (4th century CE) argued that God created everything in the universe in the same instant, and not in six days as a plain reading of Genesis would require; even earlier, 1st-century CE Jewish scholar Philo wrote that it would be a mistake to think that creation happened in six days or in any determinate amount of time.

Aside from the theological doubts voiced by other Christians, Young Earth creationism also stands in opposition to the creation mythologies of other religions (both extant and extinct). Many of these make claims regarding the origin of the Universe and humanity that are completely incompatible with those of Christian creationists (and with one another). Marshaling support for the Judeo-Christian creation myth versus other creation myths after having rejected much of the scientific evidence is largely, then, done on the basis of accepting on faith the veracity of the biblical account rather than the alternative.

Scientific refutation
The vast majority of scientists reject Young Earth creationism. Around the start of the 19th century mainstream science abandoned the concept that the Earth was younger than millions of years. Measurements of archeological, astrophysical, biological, chemical, cosmological, and geological timescales differ from YEC's estimates of the Earth's age by up to five orders of magnitude (that is, by a factor of a hundred thousand times). Scientific estimates of the age of the earliest pottery discovered at 20,000 BCE, the oldest known trees before 9,400 BCE,  ice cores up to 800,000 years old, and layers of silt deposit in Lake Suigetsu at 52,800 years old, are all significantly older than YEC estimate of the Earth's age. YEC's theories are further contradicted by scientists' ability to observe galaxies billions of light years away.

The scientific community generally regards claims that YEC has a scientific basis to be religiously motivated pseudoscience, because Young Earth creationists only look for evidence to support their preexisting belief that the Bible is a literal description of the development of the universe. In 1997, a poll by the Gallup organization showed that 5 per cent of U.S. adults with professional degrees in science took a Young Earth creationist view. 

In the aforementioned poll, 40 per cent of the same group said they believed that life, including humans, had evolved over millions of years, but that God guided this process, a view described as theistic evolution, while 55 per cent held a view of "naturalistic evolution" in which no God took part in this process. Some scientists (such as Hugh Ross and Gerald Schroeder) who believe in creationism are known to subscribe to other forms, such as day-age creationism and progressive creationism, which posit an act of creation that took place millions or billions of years ago, with variations on the timing of the creation of mankind.

Chemist Paul Braterman has argued that Young Earth creationism "bears all the hallmarks of a conspiracy theory" by "offering a complete parallel universe with its own organisations and rules of evidence, and claims that the scientific establishment promoting evolution is an arrogant and morally corrupt elite", adding that "This so-called elite supposedly conspires to monopolise academic employment and research grants. Its alleged objective is to deny divine authority, and the ultimate beneficiary and prime mover is Satan."

Adhering church bodies
 Amish Mennonites
 Communion of Reformed Evangelical Churches
 Evangelical Lutheran Synod
 Lutheran Church–Missouri Synod
 Protestant Reformed Churches in America
 Seventh-day Adventist Church
 Wisconsin Evangelical Lutheran Synod

See also

 Antediluvian
 Biblical cosmology
 Biblical literalism
 Biblical literalist chronology
 Chronology of the Bible
 Chronology of the universe
 Cosmogony
 Cosmological argument
 Creator deity
 Creation myth
 Dating creation
 Generations of Noah
 Geoscience Research Institute
 Higher criticism
 History of creationism
 International Conference on Creationism
 Theism
 Yom

Notes

References

External links

National Center for Science Education. Ten Major Court Cases about Evolution and Creationism
Moss, Stephen. "Defying Darwin". The Guardian, 2009.

 
Creation science
Pseudoscience
Creationism